Titan is the ninth studio album by Greek death metal band Septicflesh, released on June 20, 2014 through Season of Mist. At its release, the album was met with generally positive reviews by critics and fans, even if less favourable than the band's two previous albums.

Track listing 
All lyrics written by Sotiris V., all music composed by Septicflesh.

Personnel

Charts

Release history

References 

2011 albums
Septicflesh albums
Season of Mist albums
Prosthetic Records albums
Albums with cover art by Spiros Antoniou
Albums produced by Logan Mader
Albums by Greek artists